The 2015 season was Atlético de Kolkata's second season in the Indian Super League. They started their second season as the defending champions, and ended the season as the semi-finalists.

Background

On 15 May 2015, Atlético de Kolkata's board announced that they would retain former Bolivia and Valencia CF manager Antonio Lopez Habas for the 2015 season. It was under him that the team had won the title in 2014. However, in spite of their first season, the team decided in retaining just 7 players from their squad of 2014, including 3 foreigners. The team signed 5 Indians and 10 foreigners from the open market. This was followed by 7 more domestic signings from the Draft.

On 29 July 2015, the team signed Portuguese international Hélder Postiga as its marquee player.

On 25 August 2015, the team went on pre season tour to Madrid, Spain where they trained for a month.

Pre-season friendlies

Players
On 5 June 2015, the team acquired Canadian international forward Iain Hume, whose five goals had helped Kerala to the final of the previous season. In the second season's domestic draft, Atlético de Kolkata had the first pick, choosing Pune F.C. goalkeeper Amrinder Singh for a fee of 4.5 lakhs; their most expensive purchase was that of defender Augustin Fernandes for 26 lakhs. On 29 July, with García released due to his injury record, the team brought in Portugal international forward Hélder Postiga as their new marquee player; aged 32, he became the youngest such player in the league. They finalized their squad of 26, for the year, by 29 July 2015.

On 4 November, the team decided to sign last year final's goalscorer Mohammed Rafique replacing Lalchhawnkima who was ruled out due to Dengue.

On 11 November 2015, the team announced the signing of Serbian international Dejan Lekić to replace injured Josemi

On 16 November 2015, the team announced replacement for another injured player Javi Lara, who found it hard to recover quickly from a groin injury. For him, another Spanish midfielder  Jorge Alonso was signed.

Current squad

Competitions

Indian Super League

League table

Results summary

Results by round

Matches

League Stage

Semi-finals

Player statistics

Goal Scorers

Assists Table

References

Atlético de Kolkata
ATK (football club) seasons